Megacephala johnnydeppi is a species of tiger beetle in the subfamily Cicindelinae that was described by Werner in 2007.

References

johnnydeppi
Beetles described in 2007